James Bain (6 February 1899 – 22 September 1969) was a Scottish professional footballer and manager, best remembered for his 28 years as a player, manager and assistant manager at Brentford. In 2013, Bain placed fifth in a Football League 125th Anniversary poll of Brentford's best ever captains and was inducted into the club's Hall of Fame in May 2015.

Club career

Early years and Manchester United 
A centre half, Bain's began his career with hometown junior club Rutherglen Glencairn. He moved to Strathclyde and off the back of his performances earned a transfer to English Second Division club Manchester United in May 1922. Bain failed to make an appearance for the first team during the 1922–23 and 1923–24 seasons and finally made his professional debut in a 4–2 win over Leyton Orient on 7 February 1925. It proved to be his only appearance of the 1924–25 season, which meant he missed out on a Second Division winners' medal. Bain managed just two appearances during the 1925–26 First Division season and did not appear for the first team at all during 1926–27. His fourth and final appearance for the club came in a 3–0 defeat to Blackburn Rovers on 19 September 1927. Bain departed Old Trafford in July 1928.

Manchester Central and Brentford 
Bain joined newly-formed Lancashire Combination club Manchester Central in 1928. After a six-month spell, Bain returned to the Football League as a £250 signing for Third Division South club Brentford in November 1928. An immediate hit with the Bees, he was awarded the captaincy and helped the club to the 1932–33 Third Division South title. He retired from playing in 1934, after making 201 appearances and scoring two goals for Brentford. In 2013, Bain placed fifth in a Football League 125th Anniversary poll of Brentford's best ever captains.

Coaching and management
Bain became assistant to manager Harry Curtis at Brentford in 1934. Under Curtis, he was a part of the most successful period in the club's history, which saw the Bees crowned Second Division and London Challenge Cup champions in the 1934–35 season, finish fifth in the First Division in 1935–36 (the club's highest ever league placing) and win the 1942 London War Cup. After Curtis' departure in 1949, Bain served as assistant to Jackie Gibbons (1949–1952), Tommy Lawton (1953) and Bill Dodgin, Sr. (1953–1956).

Bain was named as successor to manager Jackie Gibbons in August 1952. He lasted until January 1953, before being replaced by player-manager Tommy Lawton. Prior to the dismissal of Eddie May in 1997, Bain's tenure was the shortest on record for a permanent Brentford manager. Bain retired from football at the end of the 1955–56 season and received a Football League Long Service Medal for the contribution he made at Griffin Park. He was awarded a testimonial in 1956, in which Brentford drew 1–1 with an All-Star XI. Bain was posthumously inducted into the club's Hall of Fame in May 2015.

Personal life
Bain's younger brother David was also a professional footballer who played for Manchester United (the siblings coincided on the club staff for two years, but never appeared together in a competitive fixture).

Career statistics

Managerial statistics

Honours

Brentford
Football League Third Division South: 1932–33

Individual

Brentford Hall of Fame

References

External links
MUFCInfo.com profile
 

1899 births
1969 deaths
Scottish footballers
Sportspeople from Rutherglen
Manchester United F.C. players
Brentford F.C. players
Rutherglen Glencairn F.C. players
Strathclyde F.C. players
Scottish Junior Football Association players
Brentford F.C. managers
English Football League managers
Scottish football managers
English Football League players
Association football wing halves
Manchester Central F.C. players
People from Polegate
Footballers from South Lanarkshire